Class districts were a classification system for railway goods wagons used by the  Deutsche Reichsbahn (1920–1945) in Germany between the wars.

After the Deutsche Reichsbahn had been founded in 1920, in 1921 all goods wagons types with the same or similar roles were grouped into so-called class districts. These were named after cities that were the headquarters of a Reichsbahn division or, later, other cities too. Work on re-lettering and renaming the wagons began in 1922 and was largely completed by 1924.

Legende:
S = State railways
V = Verbandsbauart
A = Austauschbauart
W = Welded

See also 
 Additional class districts from 1926
 Additional class districts from 1935
 Additional class districts from 1942

References 

Rail freight transport
Rail technologies
Rail transport in Germany